KWBU-FM (103.3 MHz), is a public non-commercial FM radio station in Waco, Texas, serving the greater Brazos Valley region.  It is operated by Baylor University, with studios on River Street in Waco. The station's Federal Communications Commission license is held by the Brazos Valley Public Broadcasting Foundation, a nonprofit community organization. Baylor has a majority of votes on the foundation board.

Many shows come from National Public Radio, with Central Texas news and information updates.  There are also blocks of classical music in late mornings and evenings, with jazz shows on weekends.  The BBC World Service is heard overnight.

History
KWBU-FM first signed on in 2000, originally on 107.1 MHz (now the location for Regional Mexican music station KLZT).  Before then, Waco had been the largest radio market in the nation without an NPR station.  In 2003, KWBU-FM was the first radio station in Waco to broadcast an HD radio signal, which doesn't stand for high definition.  When sister PBS member station KWBU-TV closed its doors in 2010 due to budget shortfalls, KWBU-FM remained in operation. Historically, both stations had been plagued by low community support. While they were technically community licensees, Baylor's controlling stake in the Brazos Valley Public Broadcasting Foundation led to the perception that they were "Baylor stations," tamping down the support needed to keep the television station on the air. At the time of KWBU-TV's shutdown, the stations only had 1,600 members, a very low number even for a market as small as Waco and nowhere near what the foundation felt was necessary to keep the television station on the air. KWBU-FM was far less expensive to run; it operated with just under half the television side's operating budget.

Limited Signal
KWBU-FM originally operated on 107.1 MHz at 2,750 watts from a 492-foot tower near Hewitt.  Now located at 103.3 MHz, it recently boosted its power to 3,200 watts from a 453-foot (138 meter) tower near Route 6 across from Richland Mall in Waco.  This is still fairly modest for a full NPR member on the FM band, especially compared to other Texas NPR stations such as KUT-FM in Austin or KERA-FM in Dallas, which are powered at a full 100,000 watts. The lower power helps protect KSSM in Copperas Cove, located at adjacent 103.1 FM.  As a result, the station's signal doesn't make it too far out of McLennan County.  Some of Waco's close-in suburbs in McLennan County only get a grade B signal.  In some communities on the outskirts of Waco, listeners tune in to KUT-FM or KERA-FM for NPR programming.

References

External links
 KWBU official website

WBU-FM
NPR member stations
Baylor University